Moore is More is the sixth studio album by American R&B singer Chanté Moore. It was released by Shanachie Records on July 30, 2013. Moore's first and only release with Shanachie, the album featured production from Louis Biancaniello, Sam Watters, Midi Mafia, Kwamé, Chris Davis, 808N, Dre Manuel, and others. Moore is More peaked at number 184 on the US Billboard 200 and  number 27 on the Top R&B/Hip-Hop Albums, marking her lowest chart yet, an was preceded by the release of two singles "Talking in My Sleep" and "Jesus, I Want You".

Background and release
Moore is More was Chanté Moore's first album in five years, and first release via Shanachie Records. The singer referred to the album as a reflection of her life at the moment, and added that it is therefore aggressive, happy, joyful, and bubbly. In an interview with soulmusic.com in May 2013, the singer explained: "I am having fun being able to sing about things that I can’t talk about. There are break-up issues and emotions that I feel regarding my last marriage. There’s lots of things that just aren’t even proper to even say out loud, except I can sing about them because it just makes more sense".

Critical reception

Andy Kellman from AllMusic wrote that "like her previous album, 2008's Love the Woman, Moore mixes it up with "grown" and contemporary pop-R&B sounds, but she does it with a fresh and lengthy supporting cast that includes Chris "Big Dog" Davis, Kwamé, the Midi Mafia, and Louis Biancaniello and Sam Watters. There's a little more range, from the blaring and cluttered dance-pop of "On and On" (featuring a guest spot from Da Brat) to a magnetic version of the '50s torch song "Cry Me a River." Unsurprisingly, the latter is a better fit, and the songs closer to it in style – more refined, deeply felt, and pared down to suit Moore's still-remarkable voice – are what make the album attractive."

Track listing

Charts

Release history

References

2013 albums
Chanté Moore albums
Shanachie Records albums
Albums produced by Kwamé
Albums produced by Midi Mafia